Stutensee is a town in northern Karlsruhe district in Baden-Württemberg, Germany.

It was founded in 1975 by the voluntary connection of the four villages of Blankenloch (with Büchig), Friedrichstal, Spöck and Staffort. In the meantime it has become a lively city with more than 23,000 inhabitants.

Palace of Stutensee

The Palace of Stutensee is the geographic center and namesake of the city. It was built in 1749 by the margrave of Baden, by the 1,000-year-old oak trees. Today an institution of the Landeswohlfahrtsverband is located here.

Geography

History
Stutensee was founded on 1 January 1975 when the four villages of Blankenloch (with Büchig), Friedrichstal, Spöck and Staffort were combined into one municipality.
All parts of the town are old villages. Spöck was first mentioned in official documents as Speccha in 865, Staffort 1110 as Stafphort, Blankenloch 1337 as Blankelach and Büchig 1373 as Buchech. Friedrichstal was founded in 1699. Huguenots fleeing religious persecution came from the north of France, and also by way of Belgium and Switzerland.

Notable people
 Axel Fischer, former member of the German parliament
 Werner Fischer, former President of the University of Applied Sciences in Karlsruhe
 Werner Raupp, historian and philosopher

Sport
One of the town's association football club FC Germania Friedrichstal, formed in 1913, experienced its greatest success in 2014 when it won promotion to the  Oberliga Baden-Württemberg for the first time.

Literature 
 
 
 
 
 
  (About Hagsfeld, Blankenloch und Friedrichstal)

Gallery

References

Karlsruhe (district)
1975 establishments in West Germany